, also known as Schwarz Ragnarok, is a Japanese web manga series written and illustrated by Yūki Imada. It was serialized on Shogakukan's online platform Sunday Webry from April to December 2017, with its chapters collected in four tankōbon volumes.

Publication
Written and illustrated by Yūki Imada, Tengoku no Ragnarok was serialized on Shogakukan's online platform Sunday Webry from April 4 to December 12, 2017. Shogakukan collected its chapters in four tankōbon volumes, released from September 12, 2017, to February 9, 2018.

References

Further reading

External links
 

Dark fantasy anime and manga
Japanese webcomics
Shōnen manga
Shogakukan manga
Webcomics in print